Henry Brown was an American inventor, perhaps best known as the inventor of a type of paper storage box.

Henry Brown developed a type of compartmented storage box intended to keep sheets of carbon paper separate from each other, and patented his invention (number 352,036) on November 2, 1886.

References

External links

19th-century American inventors
19th-century births
Year of birth unknown
Year of death unknown
African-American inventors